Alun Lewis may refer to:

Alun Lewis (actor) (born 1949), Welsh actor
Alun Lewis (poet) (1915–1944), poet
Alun Lewis (rugby union) (born 1956)

See also
Al Lewis (disambiguation)
Alan Lewis (disambiguation)
Allan Lewis (disambiguation)
Allen Lewis (disambiguation)